Sweet Talker is the first EP by American metalcore band Like Moths to Flames. It was released on December 14, 2010, through Rise Records and was produced by Landon Tewers, the lead vocalist of the band The Plot in You. The band released the first single from the EP "Dead Routine" on February 7, 2010.

Sweet Talker is the band's first and only release with bassist Aaron Douglas and drummer Jordan Matz, who left the band in 2011. After Matz's departure, guitarist Aaron Evans changed his position in the band playing bass, and in place of Douglas, Eli Ford joined on lead guitar and Lance Greenfield was introduced on drums.

Critical reception

The EP received mostly positive reviews from music critics. Zach Redrup from Dead Press! rated the EP positively but calling it: "Though it's intense, powerful and hellish from start to end, there's not much here that makes this band worth picking out more so than the flood of hundreds of other bands producing the same fairly generic post-hardcore/metalcore releases that are hitting the shelves week in and week out. This is only their debut EP release, and leaves much time for Like Moths To Flames to show their full worth and potential yet. There's still chance for these guys to pull out the big guns."

Track listing

Personnel
Like Moths to Flames
 Chris Roetter – lead vocals
 Aaron Evans – lead guitar
 Zach Huston – rhythm guitar
 Aaron Douglas – bass, backing vocals
 Jordan Matz – drums, percussion

Additional musicians
 Landon Tewers of The Plot in You – guest vocals on track 1, production

References

2010 EPs
Rise Records EPs
Like Moths to Flames albums
Metalcore EPs